Novoselye is the name of several  rural localities in Russia.

Bryansk Oblast
As of 2010, two rural localities in Bryansk Oblast bear this name:
Novoselye, Gordeyevsky District, Bryansk Oblast, a village in Strugovobudsky Selsoviet of Gordeyevsky District
Novoselye, Zhukovsky District, Bryansk Oblast, a village in Zaborsko-Nikolsky Selsoviet of Zhukovsky District

Kaluga Oblast
As of 2010, one rural locality in Kaluga Oblast bears this name:
Novoselye, Kaluga Oblast, a village in Kozelsky District

Leningrad Oblast
As of 2010, five rural localities in Leningrad Oblast bear this name:
Novoselye, Lomonosovsky District, Leningrad Oblast, a logging depot settlement in Anninskoye Settlement Municipal Formation of Lomonosovsky District
Novoselye, Osminskoye Settlement Municipal Formation, Luzhsky District, Leningrad Oblast, a village in Osminskoye Settlement Municipal Formation of Luzhsky District
Novoselye, Serebryanskoye Settlement Municipal Formation, Luzhsky District, Leningrad Oblast, a village in Serebryanskoye Settlement Municipal Formation of Luzhsky District
Novoselye, Volodarskoye Settlement Municipal Formation, Luzhsky District, Leningrad Oblast, a village in Volodarskoye Settlement Municipal Formation of Luzhsky District
Novoselye, Slantsevsky District, Leningrad Oblast, a village in Novoselskoye Settlement Municipal Formation of Slantsevsky District

Lipetsk Oblast
As of 2010, two rural localities in Lipetsk Oblast bear this name:
Novoselye, Dobrovsky District, Lipetsk Oblast, a village in Zamartynovsky Selsoviet of Dobrovsky District
Novoselye, Zadonsky District, Lipetsk Oblast, a village in Donskoy Selsoviet of Zadonsky District

Nizhny Novgorod Oblast
As of 2010, two rural localities in Nizhny Novgorod Oblast bear this name:
Novoselye, Semyonov, Nizhny Novgorod Oblast, a village in Khakhalsky Selsoviet of the city of oblast significance of Semyonov
Novoselye, Knyagininsky District, Nizhny Novgorod Oblast, a village in Ananyevsky Selsoviet of Knyagininsky District

Novgorod Oblast
As of 2010, three rural localities in Novgorod Oblast bear this name:
Novoselye, Shimsky District, Novgorod Oblast, a village in Podgoshchskoye Settlement of Shimsky District
Novoselye, Soletsky District, Novgorod Oblast, a village in Dubrovskoye Settlement of Soletsky District
Novoselye, Starorussky District, Novgorod Oblast, a village in Zaluchskoye Settlement of Starorussky District

Novosibirsk Oblast
As of 2010, two rural localities in Novosibirsk Oblast bear this name:
Novoselye, Bolotninsky District, Novosibirsk Oblast, a village in Bolotninsky District
Novoselye, Kupinsky District, Novosibirsk Oblast, a selo in Kupinsky District

Omsk Oblast
As of 2010, one rural locality in Omsk Oblast bears this name:
Novoselye, Omsk Oblast, a selo in Novoselsky Rural Okrug of Kormilovsky District

Pskov Oblast
As of 2010, ten rural localities in Pskov Oblast bear this name:
Novoselye, Gdovsky District, Pskov Oblast, a village in Gdovsky District
Novoselye, Novosokolnichesky District, Pskov Oblast, a village in Novosokolnichesky District
Novoselye, Opochetsky District, Pskov Oblast, a village in Opochetsky District
Novoselye, Plyussky District, Pskov Oblast, a village in Plyussky District
Novoselye, Pskovsky District, Pskov Oblast, a village in Pskovsky District
Novoselye, Pytalovsky District, Pskov Oblast, a village in Pytalovsky District
Novoselye, Sebezhsky District, Pskov Oblast, a village in Sebezhsky District
Novoselye (selo), Strugo-Krasnensky District, Pskov Oblast, a selo in Strugo-Krasnensky District
Novoselye (village), Strugo-Krasnensky District, Pskov Oblast, a village in Strugo-Krasnensky District
Novoselye, Velikoluksky District, Pskov Oblast, a village in Velikoluksky District

Saratov Oblast
As of 2010, one rural locality in Saratov Oblast bears this name:
Novoselye, Saratov Oblast, a khutor in Alexandrovo-Gaysky District

Smolensk Oblast
As of 2010, seven rural localities in Smolensk Oblast bear this name:
Novoselye, Demidovsky District, Smolensk Oblast, a village in Shapovskoye Rural Settlement of Demidovsky District
Novoselye, Dorogobuzhsky District, Smolensk Oblast, a village in Balakirevskoye Rural Settlement of Dorogobuzhsky District
Novoselye, Monastyrshchinsky District, Smolensk Oblast, a village in Barsukovskoye Rural Settlement of Monastyrshchinsky District
Novoselye, Shatalovskoye Rural Settlement, Pochinkovsky District, Smolensk Oblast, a village in Shatalovskoye Rural Settlement of Pochinkovsky District
Novoselye, Vaskovskoye Rural Settlement, Pochinkovsky District, Smolensk Oblast, a village in Vaskovskoye Rural Settlement of Pochinkovsky District
Novoselye, Smolensky District, Smolensk Oblast, a village in Khokhlovskoye Rural Settlement of Smolensky District
Novoselye, Yelninsky District, Smolensk Oblast, a village in Mutishchenskoye Rural Settlement of Yelninsky District

Tver Oblast
As of 2010, five rural localities in Tver Oblast bear this name:
Novoselye (Okhvatskoye Rural Settlement), Penovsky District, Tver Oblast, a village in Penovsky District; municipally, a part of Okhvatskoye Rural Settlement of that district
Novoselye (Voroshilovskoye Rural Settlement), Penovsky District, Tver Oblast, a village in Penovsky District; municipally, a part of Voroshilovskoye Rural Settlement of that district
Novoselye, Sonkovsky District, Tver Oblast, a village in Sonkovsky District
Novoselye, Staritsky District, Tver Oblast, a village in Staritsky District
Novoselye, Udomelsky District, Tver Oblast, a village in Udomelsky District

Yaroslavl Oblast
As of 2010, one rural locality in Yaroslavl Oblast bears this name:
Novoselye, Yaroslavl Oblast, a selo in Veskovsky Rural Okrug of Pereslavsky District